Jean-Jacques Rousseau (1712–1778) was a Genevan author and philosopher.

Rousseau may also refer to:

 Rousseau (surname), notable people with the surname Rousseau
 Rousseau (electoral district), a provincial electoral district in the province of Quebec in Canada
 Rousseau, Kentucky, an unincorporated community in the United States
 Rousseau Institute, a private school in the Swiss city of Geneva
 Rousseau Metal Inc., a Canadian company founded by André Rousseau
 Rousseau Peak, in Antarctica
 Rousseau Range, in the U.S. state of Alaska
 Rousseau SA, a French manufacturer of agricultural machinery which, in 1962, invented the rotary mower
 Lake Rousseau, in the U.S. state of Florida
 An alternative name for French wine made from the grape Chardonnay

See also
Roseau (disambiguation)